Sporobolus bakeri is a species of grass known by the common names sand cordgrass and bunch cordgrass. It is native to the south-eastern United States, where it grows along the coast and in inland freshwater habitat in Florida.

This species forms dense bunches up to 20 feet wide with stems up to 4 feet tall. The wiry leaves are light green on the undersides and darker on top. During winter the plant is more brown than during summer, when it is brownish-green.

This grass grows in aquatic and semiaquatic habitat, including beaches, ponds, and more upland sites. It may be used to control erosion and can tolerate flooding. It can be grown as an ornamental.

References

bakeri
Plants described in 1902
Flora of Florida